Peter Curtin (22 September 1949 – 24 February 2008) was an Australian cricketer. He played one first-class match for South Australia in 1971/72. His brothers, Paul and Barry, also played first-class cricket for South Australia.

See also
 List of South Australian representative cricketers

References

External links
 

1949 births
2008 deaths
Australian cricketers
South Australia cricketers
Cricketers from Adelaide